Billy Fleming is a landscape designer, city planner, and climate activist who currently serves as the Wilks Family Director of the Ian L. McHarg Center at the University of Pennsylvania School of Design. He is the founding director of the Center and is known for fusing climate justice and policy work with the landscape architecture and planning professions. He teaches, writes, lectures, and works on the intersection of climate change and the built environment, often through the policy framework known as the Green New Deal. He was one of the key instigators and organizers of the "Green New Deal Superstudio."

Education 
Fleming earned his Bachelor of Landscape Architecture from the University of Arkansas' Fay Jones School of Architecture and Design, followed by a Master of Community and Regional Planning from the University of Texas at Austin, and a PhD in City and Regional Planning from the University of Pennsylvania.

Career 
Formerly, he was a policy adviser in the White House Domestic Policy Council during the Obama Administration, a co-author of the Indivisible Guide, a co-creator of the Data Refuge Project, and worked briefly as a landscape designer, city planner, and community organizer.

He became the founding Wilks Family Director of the McHarg Center in 2017, where he's led a variety of public research projects, events, and coursework dedicated to the Green New Deal and its role in bringing climate justice into the design professions.

In 2018, he became a Senior Fellow with Data for Progress where he contributed to the publication of low-carbon public housing policy briefs tied to the “Green New Deal for Public Housing Act” introduced in 2019 by Rep. Alexandria Ocasio-Cortez and Senator Bernie Sanders.

In 2019, he worked with Frederick Steiner, Richard Weller, and Karen M'Closkey to organize Design With Nature Now to celebrate the 50th anniversary of Ian McHarg's landmark book. The celebration involved a conference, three exhibitions, a book, and a special issue of the journal Socio-Ecological Practice Research.

In 2020, his studio teaching won the Award of Excellence in Student Collaboration from the American Society of Landscape Architects. The studio's work served as the template for the Green New Deal Superstudio collaboration between ASLA, the Landscape Architecture Foundation, the McHarg Center, Columbia, and the Council of Educators in Landscape Architecture.

Selected publications 

 Design With Nature Now (with Frederick Steiner, Richard Weller, and Karen M'Closkey, 2019) 
 A Blueprint for Coastal Adaptation: Uniting Design, Economics, and Policy (with Carolyn Kousky and Alan Berger, 2021) 
 "Design and the Green New Deal," Places Journal 
 "To Rebuild Our Towns and Cities, We Need to Design a Green Stimulus," Jacobin Magazine 
 "The Dutch Can't Save Us From Sea-Level Rise," CityLab 
 "An Atlas for the Green New Deal," via the McHarg Center 
"A Stimulus Plan for the Planet," Los Angeles Review of Books 
"Crises and Contestations: The Promise and Peril of Designing a Green New Deal," Architectural Design
"Frames and Fictions: Designing a Green New Deal Studio Sequence," Journal of Architectural Education

References 

Living people
American architects
Climate activists
University of Pennsylvania people
Year of birth missing (living people)